Rolande Maxwell Young Schrade (1927 – 2015) was born in Washington, D.C. She was a composer, pianist, teacher, and the matriarch of a musical family with five children. After studying at Catholic University, she became a pupil of Harold Bauer at the Manhattan School of Music, and of Vittorio Giannini at the Juilliard School. In 1949, she married Robert Warren Schrade, an internationally-known concert pianist and faculty member at the Manhattan School of Music. Young made her debut as a pianist at Town Hall in New York in 1953, performing works of Bach, Beethoven, Brahms, Grieg, Chopin, Rachmaninoff, Krenek, Debussy, and her own compositions. She was a member of ASCAP.

In 1968, Rolande and Robert founded a family concert series in South Worthington, Massachusetts, incorporated in 1975 as Sevenars Concerts, Inc., a non-profit corporation under IRS Code 501(c)(3).  The name "Sevenars" was derived from "seven Rs": Robert, Rolande, and their five children Robelyn, Rhonda Lee, Rolisa, Randolph, and Rorianne, who all performed on the series at various times. The family and music festival were featured on radio and television, winning acclaim from the press. The Schrades were the first family to be listed on the Steinway & Sons artist roster, and they expanded when Robelyn married New Zealand concert pianist David James, who joined the concerts, as did their now adult children Lynelle and Christopher.

There are over a hundred published and recorded songs to Rolande's credit, including "Sunshine and Rain" and "How Can I?" (which sold over 500,000 records in the 1950's), "When the Train Came in" (with launched singer Teresa Brewer on London Records), "There's a Dream in My Heart" (RCA Victor), and "Mighty Paul Bunyan" (ABC Paramount). She also wrote new words and revised the music of the Carrie Jacobs Bond songs for Boston Music Co. In addition, she composed dozens of educational songs to inspire children throughout her decades of teaching in the New York independent school system. She saw the publication of two albums of original songs and arrangements (Songs for Special Days and America '76, A Bicentennial Salute in Song) as well as the "Allen-Stevenson Song" (published in 1969 by the Allen-Stevenson School in NYC and still serving as their school song) and the Worthington Bicentennial March for the town of Worthington, Massachusetts.

Young's compositions include:

Piano 
Little Acorn Suite

Vocal 
A is for America
A Little Less "Please", A Little More "Thank You"
Catch That Freedom Train
"Do", See the Doughnut
Don't Mention Me (recorded by Frankie Castro)
The Footsteps of America
Fortress of the Free
From Your Heart (recorded by The Bachelors)
Horn of Gold
How Can I? (recorded by Bette McLaurin and Terri Stevens)
The Lady on the Shore
Look for Joy
Mighty Paul Bunyan (recorded by Bobby Scott)
My Category is Love (recorded by Tommy Mara)
My Kingdom for a Kiss (recorded by Tommy Mara)
Santa's Lost His Glasses
Somehow There's Magic in You
Song of Peace
Sunshine and Rain (recorded by Teddy Bart and Bob Whalen)
Tender Age
The Good Song
There's a Dream in My Heart (recorded by Jaye P. Morgan)
There's a Tremolo in the Trees
Things I Shouldn't Know (recorded by Jo Anne Lear)
Vacation Song
When the Train Came In (recorded by Teresa Brewer and others)
Will the Real Santa Claus Stand Up?

Collaborations with Joe Leahy 

My Category is Love
My Kingdom for a Kiss
Sun Valley Moon
Sunshine Rain
There's a Dream in My Heart
Things I Shouldn't Know

References

1929 births
2015 deaths
Musicians from Washington, D.C.
Manhattan School of Music alumni
Juilliard School alumni
Catholic University of America alumni
ASCAP composers and authors
Place of death missing
American women composers
American women pianists
21st-century American women